Sheer Bluff is a 1921 British-Dutch silent drama film directed by Frank Richardson.

Cast
 Henry Victor - Maurice Hardacre
 Maudie Dunham - Esther
 Percy Standing - Jasper Hardacre
 Nico De Jong - Stokes
 Lily Bouwmeester - Marion Deslisle
 Hans Bruning - (as Hans Brüning)
 Theo Frenkel Jr.
 Fred Homann
 Willem Hunsche
 William Hunter
 Julie Meijer
 Julie Ruston
 Lilian Ruston
 Julie Ruys
 Jean Stapelveld
 August Van den Hoeck
 Marie Van Westerhoven

External links 
 

1921 films
British silent feature films
Dutch black-and-white films
Dutch silent feature films
British black-and-white films
1921 drama films
British drama films
Dutch drama films
Films directed by Frank Richardson
1920s British films
Silent drama films